Lomaria discolor, synonym Blechnum discolor, commonly called crown fern (Māori: piupiu), is a species of fern in the family Blechnaceae. This species is endemic to New Zealand. As noted by C. Michael Hogan, this species is found in a number of forest communities in diverse locations within New Zealand, and is sometimes a dominant understory component.

Spores are produced on specialised fronds. These are more erect, with a dark and shrivelled look.

References

 C. Michael Hogan. 2009. Crown Fern: Blechnum discolor, Globaltwitcher.com, ed. N. Stromberg
 Primitive Plants. 2009. True Ferns

Blechnaceae
Ferns of New Zealand